The 1908 United States presidential election in West Virginia took place on November 3, 1908, as part of the 1908 United States presidential election. West Virginia voters chose seven representatives, or electors, to the Electoral College, who voted for president and vice president.

West Virginia was won by the 42nd Secretary of War William Howard Taft (R–Ohio), running with representative James S. Sherman, with 53.42 percent of the popular vote, against former representative William Jennings Bryan (D–Nebraska), running with John W. Kern, a former Indiana state senator with 43.17 percent of the popular vote.

The Prohibition Party ran Eugene Chafin (P–Wisconsin) with Aaron S. Watkins, the president of Asbury College and received 1.99 percent of the vote. The Socialist Party of America chose four-time candidate for President of the United States Eugene V. Debs (S–Indiana), running with Ben Hanford, and received 1.43 percent of the popular vote.

Results

Results by county

References 

West Virginia
1908
1908 West Virginia elections